Invisibilia is a radio program and podcast from National Public Radio, which debuted in early 2015 and "explores the intangible forces that shape human behavior—things like ideas, beliefs, assumptions and emotions." The program's title comes from Latin, meaning "all the invisible things." The Guardian ranked Invisibilia among "the 10 best new podcasts of 2015." As of their seventh season, the program is hosted by Kia Miakka Natisse and Yowei Shaw; previous seasons were also hosted by Lulu Miller, Alix Spiegel and Hanna Rosin.

Background
Alix Spiegel was a founding producer of This American Life and freelanced for NPR's Science Desk covering psychology and human behavior. At Chicago's Third Coast International Audio Festival, Spiegel met former Radiolab producer Lulu Miller and asked her to co-produce a piece she was working on. The two began collaborating on radio stories and conceived of a new long-form program that would become Invisibilia. The show's first six-episode season aired from January to February 2015, with excerpts occasionally running on All Things Considered, Morning Edition, Radiolab and This American Life. This extra exposure and Miller and Spiegel's track record helped Invisibilia debut at #1 on the iTunes podcast chart and to maintain a consistent top-ten ranking in the months following its launch. Hanna Rosin from The Atlantic joined as cohost for the second season, which premiered in June 2016 and ran for seven episodes. The third season debuted in June 2017 with Spiegel and Rosin as hosts. The Atlantic included the episode "How to Become Batman"  on their list of "The 50 Best Podcast Episodes of 2015".

In June 2020, NPR announced that Spiegel and Rosin would relinquish their roles by early 2021, and Kia Miakka Natisse and Yowei Shaw were named the new co-hosts of the program, which aired its seventh season in April 2021. The show aired its eighth season in September 2021.

Awards

Episodes

Season 1
 The Secret History of Thoughts
 Fearless
 How to Become Batman
 Entanglement
 The Power of Categories
 Our Computers, Ourselves

Season 2
The New Norm
The Personality Myth
The Problem with the Solution
Frame of Reference
Flip the Script
The Secret Emotional Life of Clothes
Outside In

Season 3
 True You
 Future Self
 The Culture Inside
 Reality 
 Bubble-Hopping (Reality Part 2)
 Emotions
 High Voltage (Emotions Part 2)

Season 4
 I, I, I. Him
 The Other Real World
 What Was Not Said
 The Pattern Problem
 Everything Good
 The Callout

Season 5

 The Fifth Vital Sign
 Post, Shoot
 The Weatherman
 The Remote Control Brain
 A Very Offensive Rom-Com
 The End of Empathy
 Kraftland
 The Profile
 Back When I Was Older
 Love and Lapses
 Raising Devendra

Season 6

 Two Heartbeats a Minute
 The Confrontation
 An Unlikely Superpower
 White v. White?
 The Reluctant Immortalist 
 The Last Sound
 Trust Fall

Season 7 

 Eat the Rich
 The Chaos Machine: An Endless Hole
 The Chaos Machine (part 2): Wrathful Lord
The Chaos Machine (part 3): A Looping Revolt
The Great Narrative Escape
American Slow Radio (Bonus Episode)

Season 8 

 A Friendly Ghost Story
 Nun of Us Are Friends
 International Friend of Mystery
 Friends with Benefits

References

External links
 

2015 radio programme debuts
2015 podcast debuts
Audio podcasts
American documentary radio programs
NPR programs
Science podcasts